Boris de Greiff Bernal  (13 February 1930 – 31 October 2011) was a Colombian chess master and writer, born in Medellín and son of the Colombian poet León de Greiff.

Student in  San Bartolome Mayor School], in 1951, he won the Colombian Championship in Bogotá. In 1955, he took 16th in Mar del Plata (Borislav Ivkov won). In 1957, he won in Caracas (zonal). In 1958, he took 20th in Portorož (interzonal; Mikhail Tal won). In 1958, he took 9th in Bogotá (Oscar Panno won). In 1962, he took 18th in Havana (1st Capablanca Memorial; Miguel Najdorf won). In 1963, he took 20th in Havana (2nd Capablanca Memorial; Viktor Korchnoi won). In 1963, he took 7th in Havana (Torneo Panamericano; Eleazar Jiménez won). In 1969, he tied for 1st–2nd with Miguel Cuéllar in Bogotá. In 1970, he tied for 8–10th in Bogotá (Henrique Mecking won). In 1973, he took 15th in Cienfueogos (10th Capablanca Memorial; Vasily Smyslov won).

De Greiff played for Colombia in nine Chess Olympiads.
 In 1954, at second board in 11th Chess Olympiad in Amsterdam (+8 –6 =4);
 In 1956, at third board in 12th Chess Olympiad in Moscow (+7 –3 =9);
 In 1958, at third board in 13th Chess Olympiad in Munich (+2 –2 =15);
 In 1966, at third board in 17th Chess Olympiad in Havana (+4 –4 =8);
 In 1970, at first reserve board in 19th Chess Olympiad in Siegen (+3 –4 =1);
 In 1972, at fourth board in 20th Chess Olympiad in Skopje (+4 –4 =8);
 In 1974, at first reserve board in 21st Chess Olympiad in Nice (+6 –0 =6);
 In 1976, at first reserve board in 22nd Chess Olympiad in Haifa (+4 –0 =3);
 In 1978, at first reserve board in 23rd Chess Olympiad in Buenos Aires (+0 –1 =2).

He died in Bogotá.

Awards
 He won the individual gold medal at Haifa 1976, and the silver medal at Nice 1974.
 He was awarded the title of International Master in 1957 and International Arbiter in 1978.

 He was elected an Honorary Member of FIDE in 2002.

References

1930 births
2011 deaths
Colombian chess players
Colombian male writers
Chess arbiters
Chess Olympiad competitors
Colombian people of Spanish descent
Colombian people of Swedish descent
Colombian people of German descent
Boris
Sportspeople from Medellín
20th-century Colombian people